P2Y purinoceptor 8 is a protein that in humans is encoded by the P2RY8 gene.

Function 

The protein encoded by this gene belongs to the family of G-protein coupled receptors, that are preferentially activated by adenosine and uridine nucleotides. This gene is moderately expressed in undifferentiated HL60 cells, and is located on both chromosomes X and Y.

Clinical relevance 

Recurrent mutations in this gene have been associated to cases of diffuse large B-cell lymphoma.

See also 
 P2Y receptor

References

Further reading 

 
 
 

G protein-coupled receptors